scrcpy, pronounced "screen copy", is a free and open-source screen mirroring application that allows control of an Android device from a Windows, macOS, or Linux desktop computer. The software is currently developed by Genymobile, which also developed Genymotion, an Android emulator.

Communication between the Android device and the computer is primarily performed via a USB connection and Android Debug Bridge (ADB). The software functions by executing a server on the Android device, then communicating with the server via a socket over an ADB tunnel. It does not require rooting or the installation or running of an app on the Android device. The screen content is streamed as H.264 video, which the software then decodes and displays on the computer. The software pushes keyboard and mouse input to the Android device over the server.

Setup involves enabling USB debugging on the Android device, connecting the device to the computer, and running the scrcpy application on the computer. Additional configuration options, such as changing the stream bit rate or enabling screen recording, may be accessed via command line arguments. The software also supports a wireless connection over Wi-Fi, but that requires more steps to set up. A few features were added to scrcpy in its version 1.9 release in 2019, including the ability to turn the screen off while mirroring and to copy clipboard content between the two devices.

Chris Hoffman of How-To Geek compared scrcpy to AirMirror and Vysor, two other applications with a similar function. Hoffman also pointed to Miracast as an alternative, while noting that it is no longer widely supported among new Android devices, and that it does not support remotely controlling the device.

History 
The first commit to the GitHub repository is on 12 December 2017 by Romain Vimont. scrcpy v1.0 was released 3 months later which included the support for basic screen mirroring and Android remote control. The first release packaged a Windows Executable and the server. The community took packaging forward and made scrcpy available for numerous Linux distributions.

Version v2.0, released on 12 March 2023, also added audio support, enabling real-time audio forwarding on Android 11 and above.

Features 
The official documentation of scrcpy gives the features and ideology to which it was built

 lightness (native, displays only the device screen)
 performance (30~60fps)
 quality (1920×1080 or above)
 low latency (35~70ms)
 low startup time (~1 second to display the first image)
 non-intrusiveness (nothing is left installed on the device)

Graphical User Interface 
The command line interface of scrcpy was ported to a graphical user interface by open source developers.

References

External links 

 GitHub repository

Cross-platform free software
Android (operating system) development software
Remote administration software
Command-line software